Dražen Kekez (born 16 May 1995) is a Croatian football player. He plays for Austrian side SV Wörgl.

Club career
He made his Austrian Football First League debut for WSG Wattens on 22 July 2016 in a game against FC Blau-Weiß Linz.

References

External links
 

1995 births
Living people
Association football midfielders
Croatian footballers
WSG Tirol players
SV Wörgl players
2. Liga (Austria) players
Austrian Regionalliga players
Croatian expatriate footballers
Expatriate footballers in Austria
Croatian expatriate sportspeople in Austria